Randall David Shughart (August 13, 1958 – October 3, 1993) was a United States Army Delta Force operator who was posthumously awarded the Medal of Honor for his actions during the Battle of Mogadishu, during Operation Gothic Serpent in October 1993.

Early life
Shughart was born August 13, 1958, in Lincoln, Nebraska, into a United States Air Force family of German descent. After his father, Herbert Shughart, left the Air Force, the Shugharts moved to Newville, Pennsylvania, to live and work on a dairy farm.

Military career
Shughart joined the United States Army while attending Big Spring High School in Newville, entering upon graduation in 1976. After completing basic training, he successfully completed infantry AIT (advanced individual training), Airborne School, and in 1978 was assigned to the 2nd Ranger Battalion, 75th Ranger Regiment, at Fort Lewis, Washington. Several months later, he completed a pre-ranger course (currently known as SURT, Small Unit Ranger Tactics), was granted a slot to attend Ranger School, graduated, and earned the Ranger Tab. Shughart left active duty and went into the Army Reserve in June 1980. In December 1983, Shughart returned to active duty and the following year attended Special Forces training. Shughart was assigned to Delta Force and was transferred to Fort Bragg, North Carolina in June 1986. As a Delta Force operator, he advanced to Assistant Team Sergeant.

Shughart was deployed to Mogadishu, Somalia in 1993 as part of Task Force Ranger. On October 3, 1993, during an assault mission to apprehend advisors to the Somali warlord Mohamed Farrah Aidid, a Black Hawk helicopter with the call sign Super Six-One was shot down in the city. A combat search and rescue (CSAR) team was sent in to secure the survivors. Then, a second Black Hawk helicopter, call sign Super Six-Four, was shot down.

Shughart, Gary Gordon, and Sergeant First Class Brad Halling had been providing sniper cover from the air from Black Hawk Super Six-Two. Gordon wanted to be inserted to secure the crash site as hostile Somalis were converging on the area.

Mission commanders denied Gordon's request twice, saying that the situation was too dangerous for the snipers to protect the crew from the ground. Command's position was that the snipers could be of more assistance by providing air cover. Gordon, however, repeated his request until he got permission. Halling stayed behind to man a door gun as one of the helicopter's gunners had been wounded.

Chief Warrant Officer Mike Durant was already defending the aircraft with an MP5 but was unable to move from his chair due to a crushed vertebra in his back and a comminuted fracture of his left femur. When they reached Super Six-Four, they extracted Durant and the other crew from the helicopter and defended the aircraft. It is believed that Gordon was the first of the two to be killed by the surrounding mob. Shughart retrieved Gordon's CAR-15 rifle and gave it to Durant to use. Shortly after, Shughart was killed, the site was overrun and Durant was taken hostage. According to Durant's book In the Company of Heroes, the Somalis counted 25 of their militia dead after the firefight.

There was some confusion in the aftermath of the action as to who had been killed first. The official citation states that Shughart had been killed first but Mark Bowden, author of Black Hawk Down: A Story of Modern War, relates an account by Sergeant Paul Howe who heard Shughart call for help on the radio and noted that the weapon handed to Durant was not the distinctive M14 rifle that Shughart used. Howe said that Gordon would not have given his weapon to someone while he could still fight. Durant acknowledged that he might have been wrong in his identification but was reluctant to push for the record to be changed since he was not sure. Shughart's body was eventually recovered and is buried in Westminster Cemetery, Carlisle, Pennsylvania.

In popular culture
In the 2001 film Black Hawk Down, Shughart was portrayed by actor Johnny Strong.

Awards and decorations
SFC Shughart's awards and decorations include:

Medal of Honor 
On May 23, 1994, Shughart and Gordon were posthumously decorated with the Medal of Honor for protecting the crew of Super Six Four. They were the first Medal of Honor recipients since the Vietnam War.

Herbert Shughart, Randall Shughart's father, attended the Medal of Honor presentation ceremony at the White House, where he refused to shake hands with U.S. President Bill Clinton. He then proceeded to openly criticize the president, telling him, "You are not fit to be president of the United States. The blame for my son's death rests with the White House and with you. You are not fit to command."

USNS Shughart

In 1997, the Navy named roll-on/roll-off ship  in a ceremony at the National Steel and Shipbuilding Company, San Diego. The ceremony was attended by a number of officers and politicians including Shughart's commanding officer at the time of his death; John W. Douglass, Assistant Secretary of the Navy for Research, Development and Acquisition; Senator Bob Kerrey; and others. The ship was the first "Large Medium Speed Roll On/Roll Off (LMSR) ship" to undergo conversion from a commercial container vessel to a sealift cargo ship.

See also
 List of post-Vietnam Medal of Honor recipients

References

Further reading

External links
 
 
 
 
 
 
 
 Shughart-Gordon Urban Operations Training Center ("MOUT Site"), US Army Joint Readiness Training Center, Fort Polk, Louisiana.
 

1958 births
1993 deaths
People from Cumberland County, Pennsylvania
People from Lincoln, Nebraska
United States Army soldiers
American military snipers
United States Army Rangers
Members of the United States Army Special Forces
American military personnel killed in action
United States Army Medal of Honor recipients
Battle of Mogadishu (1993)
Battle of Mogadishu (1993) recipients of the Medal of Honor